The European Le Mans Series features several championships awarded by the Automobile Club de l'Ouest to the most successful competitors within each of the series categories each season.  Since the first full season in 2004, championships have been awarded to the highest finishing drivers and teams, while the Michelin Energy Endurance Challenge (later renamed the Michelin Green X Challenge) was introduced in 2007.  Constructors championships were introduced in 2008.

During the 2009 season, the Formula Le Mans Cup ran separate races at Le Mans Series events.  Formula Le Mans was later absorbed into the Le Mans Series in 2010.  Nico Verdonck won the Drivers' Championship while DAMS won the Teams Championship in the 2009 season.

Drivers' Championships
German driver Marc Lieb is the most successful driver in the European Le Mans Series, having four championships in the LMGT2 category between 2005 and 2008. Emmanuel Collard, Pedro Lamy, and Patrice Goueslard each have three championships.

Current categories

LMP2

 – Raced in the Michelin tyres for the first two rounds of the season.

LMP2 Pro-Am

LMGTE

LMP3

Defunct categories

LMP1

LMGTS

LMGT

LMGT1

LMGT2

 – Raced for the JMB Racing in the final round of the season.

FLM

LMGTE Pro

LMGTE Am

LMPC

 – Raced for the CURTIS Racing Technologies in the first round of the season.

GTC

Teams' Championships
France's Larbre Compétition has the most Teams' Championships in the European Le Mans Series with three, won in the LMGTS and LMGT1 categories between 2004 and 2010.

Current categories

LMP2

LMP2 Pro-Am

LMGTE

LMP3

Defunct categories

LMP1

LMGTS

LMGT

LMGT1

LMGT2

FLM

LMGTE Pro

LMGTE Am

LMPC

GTC

Constructors' Champions
In 2008, the Constructors' Championship was awarded solely to the chassis manufacturer in the LMP categories.  From 2009 onward, the chassis and engine of each entry were combined in the championship.  In the LMGTE categories established in 2011, the results of Pro and Am are combined to award a single LMGTE Constructors' Championship.

Michelin Green X Challenge
The Michelin Green X Challenge is a championship based on the energy efficiency of each entry over the course of the season.  The 2007 season had champions in each of the four categories, while from 2008 onward only a single overall champion is declared.

References
 All championship results are taken from EuropeanLeMansSeries.com

External links
 

European Le Mans Series
European Le Mans Series champions
European Le Mans Series